Look Who's Talking is a 1989 American romantic comedy film written and directed by Amy Heckerling, and starring John Travolta and Kirstie Alley. Bruce Willis plays the voice of Mollie's son, Mikey. The film features George Segal as Albert.

Plot
Mollie, an accountant living in New York City, becomes pregnant during an affair with married executive Albert. The baby, while growing inside Mollie, begins to make voice-over commentary. In her ninth month, while out shopping, Mollie and her friend Rona catch Albert with another woman and he admits he does not plan to stay with Mollie. The heartbreak and stress cause her to go into labor. A taxi driver speeds through downtown traffic to get her to the hospital in time. Mollie becomes a dedicated single mother and Mikey continues his commentary, using an "inner voice" which can also communicate with other babies. She meets the taxi driver, James, again at her apartment building. Over the next year, the two develop a friendship and tentative romantic relationship. James tells Mollie that he loves her but she says she only wants what is best for Mikey, that rushing into things is how she got into trouble and kicks him out. Mollie is forced by her boss to continue working with Albert, which makes matters worse. At the playground, Mikey is told by his friends what "daddies" are and he realizes he wants James to be his father. James comes to the apartment and tells Mikey that he will not be around anymore and Mollie listens over the baby monitor as he pours his heart out to Mikey, who admits he will miss James, too. Mollie takes Mikey to Albert's office to meet him but when he admits he does not want the responsibility of being a father because he’s going through a "selfish phase", Mollie realizes he has not changed. She leaves Albert behind for good and makes up with James. Meanwhile, Mikey wanders off on his own, searching for James, when he sees a taxi cab outside. After making his way out to the alley, he gets into a car which then gets towed away with Mikey inside it, while Mollie and James search frantically for him. After spotting him, James and Mollie give chase in his cab and eventually cut off the tow truck but discover Mikey had gotten out of the car and is now standing in the middle of heavy traffic. James and Mollie run to reach him and take him to safety, where Mikey unofficially asks James to be his father by saying his first word, "Da-da". James and Mollie realize that Mikey already sees James as his father and they decide to give it a chance, kissing passionately while Mikey considers telling them he needs a new diaper. Nine months later, Mollie gives birth to her and James' daughter and Mikey's half-sister Julie, complete with her own inner voice.

Cast
 John Travolta as James Ubriacco
 Kirstie Alley as Mollie Jensen
 George Segal as Albert
 Olympia Dukakis as Rosie
 Twink Caplan as Rona
 Joy Boushel as Melissa
 Abe Vigoda as Grandpa Vincent Ubriacco
 Christopher Aydon as Mikey (age 2 years)
 Jacob Haines as Mikey (age 1 year)
 Jaryd Waterhouse as Mikey (4 months)
 Jason Schaller as Mikey (fetus-newborn)

Voices
 Bruce Willis as the voice of Mikey
 Joan Rivers as the voice of Julie (under the pseudonym of "Baby Guess") (uncredited)

Production
As related by Violet Ramis Stiel in her book Ghostbuster’s Daughter: Life With My Dad, Harold Ramis, her biography of her father Harold Ramis, Ramis once told her that the character of Albert was based on him, as Ramis and Heckerling had a secret affair that resulted in a child.

Reception
 
The film received mixed reviews. On Rotten Tomatoes, it has a score of 55% based on 38 reviews, with an average rating of 5.4/10. The critical consensus reads: "Look Who's Talking holds some appeal thanks to its affable stars and Amy Heckerling's energetic direction, but a silly script doesn't allow wit to get a word in edgewise". At Metacritic, which assigns a weighted average score out of 100 with reviews from mainstream critics, the film received an average score of 51 based on 15 reviews, indicating "mixed or average reviews". Audiences polled by CinemaScore gave the film an average grade of "A" on an A+ to F scale.

Look Who's Talking was a surprise hit, opening at number one in the United States with $12,107,784 in its opening weekend and staying at number one for five weekends with grosses over $10 million each weekend. It eventually grossed $140,088,813 domestically and a worldwide total of $296,999,813, making it Travolta's most successful film in eleven years since Grease, the fourth highest-grossing movie of 1989, and Columbia TriStar's highest-grossing film overseas, surpassing Kramer vs. Kramer.

The film was released in the United Kingdom on April 6, 1990, and topped the country's box office that weekend.

Sequels and reboot
The film was successful enough to spawn two sequels: Look Who's Talking Too (1990) and Look Who's Talking Now (1993). The success of the first two films also inspired an ABC sitcom called Baby Talk, which aired from 1991 to 1992, and featured Tony Danza as the voice of "Baby Mickey". John Travolta, Kirstie Alley, and Olympia Dukakis are the only actors to appear in all three films in the series.

In 2010, Fast & Furious' producer Neal H. Moritz was planning to reboot the series, with the Mikey character now grown up and the father of the baby in the film. In 2019, director Jeremy Garelick was writing the script for the reboot.

References

External links

 
 
 
 

1980s pregnancy films
1989 films
1989 romantic comedy films
American independent films
American pregnancy films
American romantic comedy films
Films adapted into television shows
Films about babies
Films directed by Amy Heckerling
Films scored by David Kitay
Films set in New York City
Films shot in Vancouver
Films with screenplays by Amy Heckerling
TriStar Pictures films
Films about accountants
Films about parenting
1980s English-language films
Films about children
1980s American films